Anna Sandor is a Hungarian-born Canadian/American film and television screenwriter. Sandor began her career as an actress, becoming a writer in her mid-twenties. Her films have garnered numerous major awards, including multiple Emmy nominations, three Humanitas Prizes, the Writers Guild of America Award and the Gemini Award. She has also won the Margaret Collier Award for lifetime achievement in the Canadian industry.

Her Canadian credits include the television films A Population of One (1980), The Running Man (1981), Charlie Grant's War (1985), The Marriage Bed (1986), Mama's Gonna Buy You a Mockingbird (1987) and Two Men (1988), and episodes of the television series King of Kensington, Flappers, Seeing Things and Hangin' In, a sitcom she co-created that ran for 7 seasons.
She moved to the United States in 1989. Her American movies for television include "Miss Rose White" (Emmy winner); "Amelia Earhart, the Final Flight" (starring Diane Keaton); "My Louisiana Sky" (Emmy winner) and many other notable films.

Sandor is a graduate of Harbord Collegiate Institute and the School of Dramatic Art at the University of Windsor. She lives in San Diego, California.

References

External links
 

Year of birth missing (living people)
Living people
Canadian television writers
Canadian women screenwriters
20th-century Canadian screenwriters
20th-century Canadian women writers
21st-century Canadian screenwriters
21st-century Canadian women writers
Canadian women television writers
Writers Guild of America Award winners
Place of birth missing (living people)
Jewish Canadian writers